Où est la maison de fromage is the debut album by John Cooper Clarke, originally released in 1978. It comprises a  mix of live performances, demos and rehearsals. The name means "where is the cheese house?" in French.

Track listing
All tracks written by John Cooper Clarke except where noted

"The Time Machine Pt. 1"  – 1:43
"Letter to Fiesta"  – 1:01
"Film Extra's Extra"  – 3:46
"Majorca"  – 1:41
"Action Man"  – 1:09
"Kung Fu International"  – 1:48
"Sperm Test"  – 1:05
"Missing Persons"  – 1:56
"Split Beans"  – 4:13
"Dumb Row Laughs"  – 0:50
"Bunch of Twigs"  – 0:33
"Trains"  – 0:45
"The Cycle Accident"  – 1:18
"Gimmix"  – 3:01
"Readers Wives"  – 1:14
"Ten Years in an Open Neck Shirt, Pt. 1"
"Nothing"
"(I Married A) Monster from Outer Space"
"Ten Years in an Open Neck Shirt, Pt. 2"
"Daily Express (You Never See a Nipple In)"
"Ten Years in an Open Neck Shirt, Pt. 3"
"Salome Malone"
"Psycle Sluts, Pt. 1"

Personnel
John Cooper Clarke – vocals
Paul Burgess  – drums, percussion
Martin Hannett – bass guitar
Steve Hopkins – keyboards

External links
Lyrics and liner notes

John Cooper Clarke albums
1978 debut albums
Albums produced by Martin Hannett
Epic Records albums